Beth Willis may refer to:

Beth Willis (Neighbours), Neighbours character
Beth Willis (producer) (born 1978), British television producer

See also
Elizabeth Willis (disambiguation)